Chengxi is a town of Longhua District of Haikou, Hainan, People's Republic of China. , the town administers 6 residential communities and 9 villages.

See also 
 List of township-level divisions of Hainan

References 

Township-level divisions of Hainan